The 1994–95 South Pacific cyclone season was the least active South Pacific tropical cyclone season on record, with only two tropical cyclones officially occurring within the South Pacific Ocean basin between 160°E and 120°W. The season ran from November 1, 1994, until April 30, 1995, with the first disturbance of the season developing on November 12 and the last disturbance dissipating on March 17. The most intense tropical cyclone during the season was Tropical Cyclone William, which affected the Cook Islands. After the season the name William was retired from the tropical cyclone naming lists.

During the season, tropical cyclones were officially monitored by the Fiji Meteorological Service, New Zealand's MetService and Australia's Bureau of Meteorology. Throughout the season the United States Navy also monitored the basin and issued unofficial warnings, through its Joint Typhoon Warning Center (JTWC) and Naval Pacific Meteorology and Oceanography Center (NPMOC). Tropical cyclones that were located between the Equator and 25S were monitored by the FMS while any that were located to the south of 25S were monitored by MetService. During the season the JTWC issued warnings on any tropical cyclone that was located between 160°E and 180° while the NPMOC issued warnings for tropical cyclones forming between 180° and the American coast. The FMS, MetService and BoM all used the Australian Tropical Cyclone Intensity Scale, and measured windspeeds over a 10-minute period, while the JTWC and the NPMOC measured sustained windspeeds over a 1-minute period.


Seasonal summary 

The season was one of the most inactive tropical cyclone seasons on record, with only two tropical cyclones officially occurring within the South Pacific Ocean basin between 160°E and 120°W. The first tropical depression of the season developed out of an area of convection on November 12 to the northeast of Vanuatu, before it was named Vania on November 14 after it had become a category 1 tropical cyclone. The cyclone went on to end a long dry spell in Vanuatu, before it last noted on November 19 to the west of Port Vila, Vanuatu. The basin remained quiet until December 13, when Tropical Depression 04P developed to the east of the Solomon Islands, before going on to affect Fiji and Tonga. During the final days of 1994, several areas of low pressure developed, within the South Pacific Convergence Zone between 8°S and 16°S, and 180°W and 160°W. During December 30, one of these areas of low pressure developed into a tropical depression, within the northern Cook Islands just to the east of Pukapuka atoll. Over the next couple of days, the depression moved southeastwards towards the Southern Cook Islands and gradually developed into Tropical Cyclone William. Throughout its lifetime, William moved southeast and affected parts of French Polynesia and the Cook Islands before becoming extratropical on January 3. After William left the basin on January 5, the basin remained quiet until March 16, when Tropical Depression 18P developed near Fiji, before dissipating during the next day.

After the season had ended, the name William was retired from the tropical cyclone naming lists, while in June 1995, the World Meteorological Organization designated the FMS as a Regional Specialized Meteorological Center.

Systems

Tropical Cyclone Vania 

Over the next couple of days the depression gradually developed further as it started to move towards the southwest, before the JTWC started to issue warnings on it during November 13 and designated it as Tropical Cyclone 01P after it had become equivalent to a tropical storm. Early on November 14, as the system passed near the Solomon Island of Tikopia, TCWC Nadi reported that the system had become a category 1 tropical cyclone on the Australian scale, and named it as Vania. During that day as it continued to move towards the south — southwest and intensify, it started to affect Vanuatu with storm force windspeeds and heavy rain which helped break a long dry spell in Vanuatu.

Later that day Vania passed near or over several of the Vanuatuan islands as it continued to move towards the south — southwest, and started to weaken as it encountered a higher amount of vertical windshear. During the following day, TCWC Nadi reported that Vania had weakened into a category one tropical cyclone as the systems low level circulation stalled, before it turned and started to move westwards while located to the north of New Caledonia. Only minor damage to crops and bush houses was reported to have occurred in the archipelago while no deaths were reported. As a result of Vania affecting parts of Vanuatu during November 15, voting in provincial elections had to be extended by 24 hours.

Tropical Cyclone 04P 

The system subsequently moved south-eastwards towards Fiji and gradually developed further, before the NPMOC designated the system as Tropical Cyclone 04P and initiated advisories on the depression during December 15. Over the next couple of days, the system passed through Fiji's Lau Islands and Tonga's Haʻapai Group of islands, before system was declared extratropical as it moved below 25S and into MetService's area of responsibility.

Tropical Cyclone William 

Over the next couple of days the system moved towards the south-southeast and gradually developed further, before the NPMOC designated the depression as Tropical Cyclone 05P. During January 1, TCWC Nadi reported that the depression had developed into a category 1 tropical cyclone and named it William as it passed near the Cook Island of Autitaki. During the next day William subsequently slowly accelerated as it passed near too or over several other Cook Islands and intensified into a category 2 tropical cyclone. 

William's extratropical remnants were tracked by MetService for another couple of days as they moved south-eastwards in the westerlies, before they were last noted near 40.0S 119.5E during January 5, as they moved out of the South Pacific basin. Throughout the Southern Cook Islands caused around  worth of damage to crops, buildings and coconut trees and destroyed a causeway to a tourist resort on Aitutaki. William injured two people and destroyed over 150 houses in French Polynesia, where local leaders accused Météo-France off underestimating Williams intensity.

Tropical Depression 18P 

The system subsequently dissipated during the following day, while it was located within MetService's area of responsibility well to the northeast of Wellington, New Zealand. While 18P existed over the South Pacific, a trough of low pressure impacted Fiji, which caused moderate to heavy rain and flooding to be reported in Labasa and Nadi, while over 250 tonnes of canne were destroyed.

Season effects 
This table lists all the storms that developed in the South Pacific basin during the 1994–95 season. It includes their intensity on the Australian Tropical cyclone intensity scale, duration, name, areas affected, deaths, and damages. For most storms the data is taken from TCWC Nadi and Wellington's archives, however data for 04P and 18P have been taken from the JTWC archives as opposed to TCWC Nadi and Wellington's, and thus the winds are over 1-minute as opposed to 10-minutes.

See also 

 Atlantic hurricane seasons: 1994, 1995
 Pacific hurricane seasons: 1994, 1995
 Pacific typhoon seasons: 1994, 1995
 North Indian Ocean cyclone seasons: 1994, 1995

References

External links 

 
South Pacific cyclone seasons
Articles which contain graphical timelines